Shalun is a railway station which opened on 2 January 2011. It is operated by the Taiwan Railways Administration and is a terminal station on the Shalun line, located in Gueiren District, Tainan City, Taiwan. It connects to the THSR Tainan Station.

The departure time of the local train is about XX:00 and XX:30. It requires about 22 minutes and NT$25 from Shalun to Tainan Station. Similar to other stations on the line, it is equipped with multiple card-reading machines.

Around the station
 Tainan Prison
 Tainan HSR station
 Shalun Smart Green Energy Science City

See also

 List of railway stations in Taiwan

References

2011 establishments in Taiwan
Railway stations in Tainan
Railway stations opened in 2011
Railway stations served by Taiwan Railways Administration